Liyuan Town is a town situated in northwestern side of Tongzhou District,Beijing, China. It shares border with Yangzhuang and Jiukeshu Subdistricts to the north, Linheli Subdistrict to the northeast, Zhangjiawan Town to the east, Wenjing Subdistrict to the south, and Heizhuanghu Township to the west. As of 2020, its total population was 285,445.

The town's name Liyuan came from a pear orchard within the region during the Ming dynasty.

History

Administration divisions 
In the year 2021, Liyuan Town was made up of 41 subdivisions, including 15 communities and 26 villages:

Economics 
In 2018, the total tax revenue of Liyuan Town was 1.2 billion Chinese yuan, and the average personal income of the residents was 38 thousand Chinese yuan.

See also 

 List of township-level divisions of Beijing

References 

Towns in Beijing
Tongzhou District, Beijing